Enric Sala (born November 26, 1968, Gerona) is a former university professor who saw himself writing the obituary of ocean life, and quit academia to become a full-time conservationist as a National Geographic Explorer-in-Residence. Sala’s present goals are to help protect critical marine ecosystems worldwide, and to develop new business models for marine conservation. He also produces documentary films and other media to raise awareness about the importance of a healthy environment, and to inspire country leaders to protect more of the natural world.

Early life and education 
Sala grew up near the Costa Brava in Catalonia, Spain, where he developed a lifelong passion for the ocean. He obtained his Bachelor of Science in Biology from the University of Barcelona in 1991 and a Ph.D. in ecology from the University of Aix-Marseille, France in 1996. Sala then moved to the United States to become a professor at Scripps Institution of Oceanography.

Career 
Sala was a professor at the Scripps Institution of Oceanography in La Jolla, California (2000–2007) and a researcher at Spain's National Council for Scientific Research (CSIC) (2007–2008). At Scripps, Sala helped create the Center for Marine Biodiversity and Conservation, an innovative multidisciplinary program to train future leaders in marine conservation. In 2006, Enric moved back to Spain to hold the first position on marine conservation ecology at the Spanish National Council for Scientific Research (CSIC).

One day, Sala was hit with a stark realization: “What I was doing was simply writing the obituary of the ocean," he says. "I was describing how ocean life was dying with more and more precision, but not offering a cure. I felt like the doctor who was telling the patient how she was going to die, but not offering a solution."

Following this realization, Sala read a  National Geographic Magazine article about Mike Fay, a National Geographic Explorer who trekked across central Africa and convinced the president of Gabon to create 13 national parks. Sala was inspired—this sort of project was exactly what he wanted to do in the ocean. Shortly thereafter, Sala decided to approach National Geographic with a plan. “I went to National Geographic and proposed a project combining exploration, research, and media to inspire governments to make marine reserves–national parks in the sea."  

In 2008 Sala was named a National Geographic fellow and began to develop the Pristine Seas initiative. In 2011, he and James Cameron were both named National Geographic Explorer-in-Residence.

Pristine Seas 
Since 2008, Sala has led National Geographic Pristine Seas. Pristine Seas is a project to explore, document and protect the last wild places in the ocean. Using a combination of expeditions, science, media and policy analysis, the Pristine Seas team has helped to inspire the protection of 22 marine protected areas covering more than 5.7 million square kilometers of ocean. Pristine Seas is a small team of less than thirty people based in Washington, DC and other sites around the world. The team has conducted 31 expeditions, published more than 90 scientific papers in peer-reviewed scientific journals, and produced 28 documentary films.

Research 
Sala's research not only shows the human impacts in the ocean, but it also shows how marine ecosystems can recover, and develops practical solutions to improve the health of our oceans. His scientific publications are widely recognized and used for conservation efforts. Pristine Seas’ research results include the discovery of an inverted biomass pyramid in pristine coral reefs, new species of fish and invertebrates, previously unknown populations of deep-sea animals, the deepest plant ever found in the ocean, descriptions of some of the healthiest ocean ecosystems, and a description of the ecological and economic benefits of no-take marine reserves. In 2018, Sala published a study revealing that without government subsidies, more than half of fishing activity on the high seas would be unprofitable.

Filmography
2019

 The Last Ice (2019)

2017

 Cape Horn: The sea at the end of the world (National Geographic Channel International, 2017)
 Juan Fernández: The sea forever (National Geographic Channel International, 2017)
 Revillagigedo: Mexico’s wildest seas (2017)

2016

 Wild Galapagos: Pristine Seas (NatGeo Wild, 2016)
 Before the Flood (Fisher Stevens, 2016)
 Inn Saei (Hrund Gunnsteinsdottir, 2016)
 Palau: Pristine Paradise (NatGeo Wild, 2016)

2015

 Russia’s Far North (NatGeo Wild, 2015)

2014

 Africa's Wild Coast (NatGeo Wild, 2014)

2013

 Wild Gabon (NatGeo Wild, 2013)
 Sharks of Lost Island (NatGeo Wild, 2013)

2012

 Lost Sharks of Easter Island (NatGeo Wild, 2012)

2011

 Secrets of the Mediterranean: Cousteau's Lost World (NatGeo Wild, 2011)

2010

 Shark Island (NatGeo Wild, 2010)

2009

 Journey to Shark Eden (National Geographic Channel, 2009)

Publications 
Sala has authored over 150 publications; a selection is listed here.

Books 

 Sala, Enric (2020). The Nature of Nature. National Geographic.
 Sala, Enric (2015). Pristine Seas: Journeys to the Ocean's Last Wild Places. National Geographic.
 Jackson, Jeremy B.C., Alexander, Karen E., Sala, Enric (2011). Shifting Baselines: The Past and Future of Ocean Fisheries. Island Press.

Select research publications 

 Dinerstein, Eric. et al. (2019). "A global deal for nature: guiding principles, milestones, and targets". Science Advances 5. eaaw2869. doi:10.1126/sciadv.aaw2869.
 Sala, Enric & S. Giakoumi (2018). “No-take marine reserves are the most effective protected areas in the ocean”. ICES Journal of Marine Science 75 (3): 1166-1168 https://doi.org/10.1093/icesjms/fsx059
 Sala, Enric. et al. (2018). "The economics of fishing the high seas". Science Advances 4(6): eaat2504. doi:10.1126/sciadv.aat2504.
 Sala, Enric et al. (2013). “A general business model for marine reserves”. PLoS One 8 (4), e58799 https://doi.org/10.1371/journal.pone.0058799
 Worm, Boris. et al. (2006). "Impacts of biodiversity loss on ocean ecosystem services". Science 314, 787–790. doi:10.1126/science.1132294
 Sala, Enric & N. Knowlton (2006). “Global marine biodiversity trends”. Annual Review of Environment and Resources 31, 93-122. 
 Pandolfi, John M. et al. (2003). "Global trajectories of the long-term decline of coral reef ecosystems". Science. 301(5635):955-8. doi:10.1126/science.1085706
 Sala, Enric. et al. (2002). "A general model for designing networks of marine reserves". Science. 298(5600):1991-3. doi:10.1126/science.1075284
 Aburto-Oropeza, Octavio. et al. (2001). "Large recovery of fish biomass in a no-take marine reserve". PLoS ONE 6(8): e23601. https://doi.org/10.1371/journal.pone.0023601

References

External links

 Personal Website: Enricsala.com
 Enric Sala at TED
 Enric Sala on Twitter
 Enric Sala on Instagram
 Pristine Seas on Instagram
 Washington Post: National Geographic's Enric Sala is a man on a mission (2011)
 Project Syndicate: Now or Never for Saving Our Natural World (2020)
 New York Times: A Marine Ecologist Strives to Protect the Seas (2015)
 The National: To the ends of the earth: Enric Sala, the explorer saving life in our oceans (2018)

Living people
Spanish marine biologists
1968 births
University of the Mediterranean alumni